Diary of a Hitman is a 1992 American crime drama film directed by Roy London and written by Kenneth Pressman, based on his play Insider's Price. The film stars Forest Whitaker, Sherilyn Fenn, James Belushi, Sharon Stone and Lois Chiles. While not a hit during its original release, it has since acquired a cult fandom.

Synopsis
A veteran hit man, Dekker is ready to call it quits and leave the profession. Dekker's final job, however, proves to be trickier than expected when the sadistic Zidzyck recruits the assassin to kill his wife, Jain.

Cast
 Forest Whitaker as Dekker
 John Bedford-Lloyd as Dr. Jameson
 Seymour Cassel as Koenig
 James Belushi as Shandy
 Lois Chiles as Sheila
 Sharon Stone as Kiki
 Sherilyn Fenn as Jain

Production
Roy London was Fenn and Stone's acting coach.

References

External links

1991 films
American independent films
1990s thriller drama films
Films about contract killing
Films set in Pittsburgh
Films shot in Ohio
Films shot in Youngstown, Ohio
Films scored by Michel Colombier
American neo-noir films
1991 directorial debut films
1991 drama films
1992 drama films
1992 films
1990s English-language films
1990s American films